Altınçevre is a village in the Hozat District, Tunceli Province, Turkey. The village is populated by Kurds of the Karabal tribe and by Turks. It had a population of 96 in 2021.

References 

Kurdish settlements in Tunceli Province
Villages in Hozat District